The semicollared puffbird (Malacoptila semicincta) is a species of near-passerine bird in the family Bucconidae, the puffbirds, nunlets, and nunbirds. It is one of seven species of the genus Malacoptila. It is found in Bolivia, Brazil, and Peru.

Taxonomy and systematics

The semicollared puffbird and the white-chested puffbird (M. fusca) were for a time considered conspecific but are now treated as a superspecies. It is monotypic.

Description

The head and upperparts are blackish brown; pale shafts to the feathers give a streaked appearance. Its tail is brown. It has a whitish "whisker" and chin and a thin white crescent across the upper breast. The back of the neck has a rufous "collar". The underparts are whitish with blackish streaks on the lower breast and flanks. The bill is mostly black above and yellow-orange below, the eye dark red with a white ring around it, and the feet pale greenish pink.

Distribution and habitat

The semicollared puffbird is found in western Amazonia where far western Brazil, southeastern Peru, and far northern Bolivia meet. It inhabits transitional forest and the edges of humid tropical evergreen terra firme forest, usually from the undergrowth up to the lower mid-story.

Behavior

Feeding

The semicollared puffbird's feeding behavior and diet have not been documented.

Breeding

The semicollared puffbird's breeding phenology has not been documented.

Vocalization

The semicollared puffbird's song is a "series of thin, rather high-pitched, melancholy, descending 'Fééeur' or 'pseuu' whistles, each at first widely spaced...and starting on the same pitch; then dropping in pitch, 'pseuu-uuu-uuu'."

Status

The IUCN has assessed the semicollared puffbird as being of Least Concern, though its population is unknown and is believed to be decreasing. It occurs in one protected are in Peru.

References

semicollared puffbird
Birds of the Amazon Basin
Birds of the Peruvian Amazon
Birds of the Bolivian Amazon
semicollared puffbird
semicollared puffbird
Taxonomy articles created by Polbot